Min Young-won (born Jo Hyo-kyung on January 5, 1984) is a South Korean actress. She has mostly played supporting roles in television dramas such as Boys Over Flowers and Brilliant Legacy (both in 2009).

Filmography

Television series

Film

Variety show

Music video

References

External links 
 
 
 

1984 births
Living people
South Korean television actresses
South Korean film actresses
Seoul Institute of the Arts alumni